Annalise Murphy (born 1 February 1990) is an Irish sailor who won a silver medal in the 2016 Summer Olympics. She competed at the 2020 Summer Olympics in Tokyo 2021, in Laser Radial.

Life 
She is a native of a suburb of Dublin. Her mother Cathy McAleavy, competed as a sailor in the 1988 Summer Olympics.  competing in the 470 class at the Olympics in Seoul in 1988.

Career
Murphy competed at the 2012 Summer Olympics in the Women's Laser Radial class. She won her first four days of sailing at the London Olympics and, on the fifth day, came in 8th and 19th position. On the sixth day of sailing she came 2nd and 10th and slipped down to second, just one point behind the Belgian world number one. She was a very strong contender for the gold medal but in the medal race she was overtaken on the final leg by her competitors and finished in 4th, her personal best at a world class regatta.

Murphy won her first major medal at an international event when she won gold at the 2013 European Sailing Championship. She was nominated for the 2013 RTÉ Sports Person of the Year in December 2013.

On 16 August 2016, Murphy won the silver medal in the Laser Radial at the 2016 Summer Olympics. In December 2016, she was honoured as the Irish Times/Sport Ireland 2016 Sportswoman of the Year.

In 2017, Annalise Murphy was chosen as the grand marshal of the Dublin St Patrick's day parade in recognition of her achievement at the Rio Olympics.

Volvo Ocean Race 2017-18
In a change of career direction, Annalise joined Dee Cafari's team competing as a team member on a Volvo 65 yacht.

Significant results
2016: Summer Olympics, Rio de Janeiro, Brazil – 

2013: European Championships, Dublin, Ireland – 

2012: Summer Olympics, London, UK – 4th

2011: World Championships, Perth, Australia – 6th

2010: Skandia Sail for Gold regatta – 10th

2010: Became the first woman to win the Irish National Championships.

2009: World Championships – 8th

Television and radio
On 11 August 2012, Murphy was a guest on Saturday Night with Miriam. On 15 May 2013, she was a guest on The Ray D'Arcy Show on Today FM, and was interviewed by Alan Hughes on TV3's Ireland AM. She appeared on The Late Late Show on 2 September 2016.

References

External links
 
 
 
 
 Annalise Murphy at RTÉ
 

1990 births
Living people
Irish female sailors (sport)
Olympic sailors of Ireland
Olympic medalists in sailing
Olympic silver medalists for Ireland
Sailors at the 2012 Summer Olympics – Laser Radial
Sailors at the 2016 Summer Olympics – Laser Radial
Sailors at the 2020 Summer Olympics – Laser Radial
Medalists at the 2016 Summer Olympics
Sportspeople from County Dublin
Volvo Ocean Race sailors
People educated at The High School, Dublin
Alumni of University College Dublin
People from Rathfarnham
Sportspeople from South Dublin (county)